The Chevrolet Kodiak and GMC TopKick are a range of medium duty trucks that were produced by the Chevrolet and GMC divisions of General Motors from 1980 to 2009. Introduced as a variant of the medium-duty C/K truck line, three generations were produced. Slotted between the C/K trucks and the GMC Brigadier Class 8 conventional, the Kodiak/TopKick were developed as a basis for vocationally-oriented trucks, including cargo haulers, dump trucks, and similar vehicles; on later generations, both cutaway and cowled-chassis variants were produced for bus use.

Following years of declining market share, General Motors (in line with Ford Motor Company) sought to exit heavy-truck manufacturing. After struggling to enter joint ventures or sell the rights to its product line, the company ended production of the Kodiak and TopKick in 2009. The final medium-duty truck, a GMC TopKick 5500, rolled out of Flint Truck Assembly on July 31, 2009.

For the 2019 model year, after a ten-year hiatus, General Motors re-entered the conventional medium-duty truck segment. Developed in a joint venture with Navistar International, the Chevrolet Silverado 4500/5500 is a Class 4-6 vehicle. Slightly smaller than the Kodiak/Topkick, the Silverado 4500/5500 is marketed exclusively as a Chevrolet (with no GMC counterpart).



First generation (1981–1989)

For 1981, General Motors introduced the Chevrolet Kodiak and GMC TopKick as short-hood variants of the medium-duty C/K trucks.  Developed to accommodate the Caterpillar 3208 V8 diesel engine, the Kodiak/TopKick moved the cab upward several inches for the use of a larger radiator.  While sharing the C/K cab, the hood length was shortened, reducing the BBC length to 92 inches.

Officially receiving the Chevrolet C70/GMC C7000 model nomenclature, the Kodiak name followed Chevrolet "frontier beast" naming tradition for its heavy conventionals (Chevrolet Bison and Chevrolet Bruin) while the GMC TopKick was a military slang term (following GMC Brigadier and GMC General).  Though produced with a single engine, the Kodiak/TopKick were offered with both single and tandem-axle drive configurations; both straight truck and semitractor configurations were produced.

Following the retirement of Chevrolet from the Class 8 truck segment after 1981, the Class 7 Kodiak became the largest truck offered by Chevrolet.  Alongside the raised height of the cab and its shorter length, the hood of the model line has a larger grille (repositioning the headlamps between the grille and bumper).

Second generation (1990–2002)

The second generation of the Chevrolet Kodiak/GMC TopKick was introduced for 1990. Under the GMT530 architecture, all GM medium-duty trucks were consolidated under the Kodiak/TopKick nomenclature, with C/K shifting to consumer-derived vehicles (pickup trucks). Following the 1986 joint venture between GM and Volvo, GMC ended production of the General, Astro, and Brigadier, leaving the Class 6-7 Kodiak/TopKick as the largest vehicles produced by GM.

In line with the previous generation, while designed with its own heavier-duty chassis, the cab of GMT530 trucks was derived from the GMT400 C/K pickup (introduced in 1988) to lower the costs of tooling. As before, two-door and four-door configurations were offered; a raised-roof cab became optional during the 1990s. Over its thirteen-year production run, the GMT530 platform underwent relatively few changes; as airbags were not required in medium-duty trucks, the 1988-design interior was retained through the entire production run.  For 1997, GM replaced the Kodiak and TopKick badging with C5500-C8500 model names, bringing the medium-duty trucks in line with the rest of the C/K naming convention. As an option, a lower-profile "aerodynamic" hood became available (not offered on severe-service or school bus applications).

In a break from the single engine offering of the first generation Kodiak/TopKick, GMT530 adopted the powertrain line of the 1973-1989 medium-duty C/K trucks. Gasoline engines were offered as standard equipment, with diesel engines as an option. The standard gasoline engine was a 6.0L fuel-injected V8, with an optional carbureted 7.0L V8 (replaced by a 7.4L V8 in 1991); in the mid-1990s, the 7.4 L became the standard gasoline engine. In 2002, the 7.4-liter V8 was replaced by the 8.1-liter Vortec V8 (the highest-displacement V8 ever offered in a production vehicle by Chevrolet). This was upgraded to produce  beginning with the 1991 model year. The Caterpillar 3126 inline-six was introduced as an optional diesel engine in 1997.

After GM ended production of the GMT530 for the US market after 2002, production for Mexico continued in Toluca, Mexico, through 2008. From 1995 to 2001, the GMT530 was assembled in Brazil using components imported from Mexico, built to Mexican specifications. All Brazil-market examples were produced with the Caterpillar 3116 diesel engine. In Brazil, the trucks were badged according to their GMVR (in metric tons) and rounded horsepower output (12-170 for 12 tons-170 hp, 14-190 for 14 tons-190 hp, and 16-220 for 16 tons-220 hp).

In May 2021, the final GMT530-based vehicle built at the Janesville plant was put up for auction. The 2002 GMC C8500 tandem-axle dump truck was owned and operated by the city of Janesville for nearly 20-years prior to the sale. The vehicle bore the signatures of numerous former employees of the plant.

Third generation (2003–2009)

For 2003, General Motors released the third-generation Chevrolet Kodiak/GMC TopKick under the GMT560 architecture. As General Motors felt the two names had better marketplace recognition, the medium-duty truck line was released under the previous Kodiak/TopKick nameplates, with Cx500 as a secondary part of the nomenclature. Showcased as part of the redesign was a change in the design layout of the Kodiak/TopKick. To better compete with the better-selling International DuraStar and Freightliner Business Class M2 medium-duty truck ranges, the GMT560 trucks switched to a vertically-oriented cab configuration to allow for a lower cab floor, increased cab space, and better entry and exit. Derived from the Chevrolet Express/GMC Savana full-size van, the cab was produced in two-door and four-door configurations (as the commercial trucks had a GVWR of over 8500 pounds, they were produced without airbags).

During its production, the GMT560 was produced with few changes. With the exception of grilles, Kodiaks and TopKicks are nearly identical; depending on trim, versions are produced with either two or four headlights. Carried over from the previous generation, the GMT560 chassis was produced in Class 5-7 configurations, in C4500, C5500, C6500, and C7500 models. Effectively, a successor to the GMC Brigadier, a tandem-axle C8500 model was introduced (with up to a 46,000-lb GVWR).

On the GMT560 Kodiak/TopKick, the powertrain configuration was derived from the model specification. On C4500/C5500s, an 8.1L V8 was carried over from the previous generation, with a 6.6L Duramax V8 diesel replacing the Caterpillar 3116. Diesel engines were standard on C6500s and up, with the 7.8L Duramax LG4 inline-6 as standard, with a 7.2L Caterpillar C7 (a redesigned Caterpillar 3126) offered as an option.

GMT560 four-wheel drive 
In 2005, GM added four-wheel drive as a factory-installed option on C4500/C5500 Kodiak/TopKicks. In a break from GM truck naming tradition, the models did not adopt the "K" nomenclature, becoming the C4500/5500 4x4 model line.  In place of independent front suspension (used on the 3500-series pickup trucks), the GMT560 4x4s used a solid front axle suspension. Powered by a 6.6L Duramax V8, the 4x4 used a 5-speed Allison 2000 series in 2005-2006 (replaced by a 6-speed Allison 2350 automatic) with a New Process 273C transfer case. 5.13:1 was the only axle gear ratio offered for 4x4 versions.

For 2007, GM introduced a heavier-duty 9000 lb spring and brake option package for the Dana 70HD front axle; rear axles (Dana S14-110L) were available in four sizes: 11,000 lb, 13,500 lb, 15,000 lb, and 19,000 lb (the latter two were options on two-wheel drive configurations).

Isuzu H-Series
For 2003, Isuzu released a conventional-cab truck, named the Isuzu H-Series. Intended largely for vocational use, the Isuzu H-Series was marketed as a competitor for the Hino 600 and Freightliner M2.  Based on the Kodiak/TopKick C6500/C7500, the H-Series differed solely in its grille design, sharing the 7.8L Duramax inline-six with the C6500/7500 and the Chevrolet/GMC T6500/7500 (based on the Isuzu Forward).

As of current production, the H-Series is the first (and only) conventional-cab truck sold by Isuzu.

Discontinuation and replacement 

In December 2007, GM announced its intention to sell its medium-duty truck business, including the Kodiak and TopKick, to Navistar International. In August 2008, both GM and Navistar announced that their memorandum of understanding for the purchase had expired and was not renewed.

After four years of working with multiple potential buyers, including an anticipated five-year deal with Isuzu Motors announced late in January 2009 to take over the production line in Flint, Michigan, General Motors decided to wind down its medium-duty truck operations. Production of the Chevy Kodiak and GMC TopKick medium duty trucks in Flint ceased on July 31, 2009.

Chevrolet Silverado HD (2019-present) 

At the 2018 Work Truck Show in Indianapolis, Indiana, General Motors launched a new line of medium-duty trucks for the 2019 model year.  Developed in a joint venture with Navistar International, Chevrolet launched the Chevrolet Silverado 4500HD, 5500HD, and 6500HD (for Classes 4,5, and 6, respectively).  In the joint venture, the trucks are assembled by Navistar in its Springfield, Ohio facility; Navistar also markets the model line as the International CV.

In a shift from previous generations of GM commercial trucks, the Silverado 4500HD/5500HD/6500HD is sold with no GMC counterpart.  Alongside with its dual branding by Navistar, General Motors is changing the market position of GMC, shifting it away from commercial fleet sales and focusing towards its premium Denali model lines.  In another break from tradition, the Kodiak name was retired, as the Silverado name was expanded to nearly the entire Chevrolet truck range, with the exception of the Colorado mid-size pickup, the Express van, and the Low Cab Forward (Isuzu Elf/NPR).

Sharing its cab with the K2XX-generation Silverado, the medium-duty Silverado was designed with a dedicated chassis with a forward-tilting hood; both 4x2 and 4x4 configurations are produced.  As of current production, the model line is offered with a 350 hp 6.6L Duramax turbodiesel V8; the engine is paired with an Allison automatic transmission.

Variants

School bus

Following in the tradition of its medium-duty C/K predecessor, the second-generation Kodiak/TopKick was utilized by General Motors to supply the school bus industry throughout its production run. In an unusual move at the time, starting in 1992, GM offered the Kodiak/TopKick solely to a single body manufacturer, Blue Bird Corporation from 1992 to 2002. While the GM chassis was not offered to other manufacturers, Blue Bird offered other available combinations (Ford B700, International 3800, and the later Freightliner FS65) for an additional price. The pairing of manufacturer and chassis supplier would become common through the 1990s in school bus manufacturing, but after 2002, General Motors would become unable to remain a chassis supplier. The Kodiak/TopKick school bus chassis is also notable for being one of the last full-size school bus chassis powered by a gasoline engine.

Pickup conversion

A special Kodiak C4500 was introduced at the 2006 Chicago Auto Show. Aimed at the International RXT (also introduced there), pricing was set at $70,000. The two shared a number of similarities, such as the options included in their premium packages (a powerful audio system and DVD-based navigation system).

A conversion of the commercial GMC TopKick called the Ultimate Class IV TopKick Pickup crew cab pickup truck was developed by General Motors and Monroe Truck Equipment (MTE). This special version featured an  steel dually pickup box and tailgate with custom composite side panels and protective Rhino interior lining. This vehicle served as the alternate mode for the character Ironhide in the first three Transformers films.

Cadillac One

Since 2009, the United States Presidential State Car has become labeled "Cadillac One" (in line with Air Force One and Marine One).  As a result of its massive size (though officially classified, it is estimated to weigh between 15,000–20,000 pounds), it is also nicknamed "The Beast".  Corresponding to its operation by the Secret Service, many details about the vehicle are classified.  While its chassis specifications were never officially revealed by Cadillac or the Secret Service, during its development, the vehicle was seen in testing alongside GMT560 GMC TopKicks.

In place of previous limousines, the highly armored vehicle was not based upon a production Cadillac model line, instead wearing a body developed specifically for its use as a state car; externally, the vehicle used various components from several Cadillac model lines.

In 2018, the second generation of "Cadillac One" limousines entered service, again using the medium-duty GMT560 diesel truck chassis.  Differing from its predecessor primarily by its adoption of contemporary Cadillac design elements, it is again not derived from a specific model line.

External links

Car and Driver road tests for the C4500.

References 

Kodiak
Pickup trucks
School bus chassis
Tractor units
1980s cars
1990s cars
2000s cars
Class 5 trucks
Class 6 trucks
Class 7 trucks